This is a list of characters appearing in the animated television series Drawn Together.

Main characters

Princess Clara 
Voiced by Tara Strong
Princess Clara is a parody of Disney princesses (mostly Ariel from The Little Mermaid, Belle from Beauty and the Beast and possibly Giselle from Enchanted). Most of her humor revolves around her bigotry, gullibility, stupidity and religious fanaticism. Among reality show archetypes, she represents the sheltered rich girl. According to creators Jeser and Silverstein, they partially based Clara on The Real World: New Orleans Julie Stoffer, a Mormon who had little experience dealing with gay people or people of other cultures and who tended to make offensive remarks without realizing it.

Originally, while Clara was portrayed as being bigoted, she never seemed to be genuinely and completely hateful. For example, she seemed to get along with both Foxxy and Xandir despite being bigoted and homophobic, and acted surprised and confused when they were offended by her behavior, as well as having a brother-sister relationship with Wooldoor. She often clashes with (and loses to) Foxxy due to her bigotry, though she sees her as one of her best friends. Usually, Foxxy returns the same feeling, until she makes more bigoted remarks towards her.

However, later episodes show her as harsh, strident, fundamentalist and intolerant. Concerned solely with crusading against sinfulness, her desire to quench sin is so strong that she shows no concern for the happiness or well-being of others. In "Foxxy VS the Board of Education", she vows to stop Spanky's gay marriage to Xandir despite Spanky's life being in danger without the insurance Xandir can provide. In "Clum Babies", she crusades against both Wooldoor's masturbation and the use of the Clum Babies to heal the sick despite the number of lives being saved and diseases being cured, but ultimately, and hypocritically, disguises herself in an attempt to procure a Clum Baby to cure her tuberculosis. On her behavior in this episode, executive producer Freiberger stated, "Clara's attitude about it all is completely in character for her as a character and for her as a symbol of the religious right. She's definitely a meat eater as we've seen in the past and she's not above killing animals. She is against harming embryos no matter how much good it will do for the living unless it benefits her directly. In that instance, she's more than willing to be a hypocrite to save her own life." Clara's vagina was originally a tentacled monster called the Octopussoir due to a curse by her wicked stepmother, but after multiple labioplasties became the Vajoana, who she likes to expose and allow to talk. Executive Producer Bill Freiberger has stated, when discussing Clara's behavior in "Spelling Applebee's", "While Clara is sometimes misguided out of ignorance or naïveté she is also very often misguided because she is a selfish, spoiled princess (figuratively and literally)."

Because of her beliefs and bigotry, Clara is a frequent recipient of physical violence at the hands of the other housemates. For the most part, Clara is unaware that she is being offensive to others; her beliefs were instilled into her by her father. Throughout the first half of Season Three, Clara begins a dark, downward spiral, reaching her lowest point in "Lost in Parking Space"; believing that the Rapture had come and left her behind, Clara sells her soul to a delivery driver whom she believes to be Satan and dedicates herself to hurting others, ultimately becoming a torturer. However, when she discovers that her first victim is Foxxy, she realizes her mistake and rededicates her life to God, becoming a much kinder and sympathetic individual. In "Ghostesses in the Slot Machine", she is revealed to have a strong Electra complex towards her father, originated from him preferring to be with strippers rather than her, which causes her to have simulated lesbian sex with Foxxy in front of him.

In original artwork before the show's release, Clara was originally drawn as a blonde, with a different dress and a lighter skin tone.

Wooldoor Sockbat 
Voiced by James Arnold Taylor
A bizarre children's show character in the mold of SpongeBob SquarePants or Stimpy with many of the typical reality-defying behaviors as seen in the Looney Tunes cartoons and the Tex Avery-directed MGM animated shorts. He is also good friends with Xandir, Spanky, and sometimes Captain Hero. Most of his humor revolves around his childlike innocence, his happy-go-lucky nature, or his general strangeness; he is often used to assume a variety of professions to fit the needs of the scene. Among reality show archetypes, he represents the attention-starved weirdo. Wooldoor is the least mature out of all the main characters, reaching puberty in "Clum Babies"; though Ling-Ling is far younger in actual calendar years, despite being a fully grown individual of his species.

Originally, Wooldoor's role was to have been that of a bipolar drug addict. However, creators Jeser and Silverstein decided to change this when Comedy Central producers protested, noting that the cast's personalities were getting too dark, and they needed a character who was innocent and childlike to contrast with the darker tendencies of the others; though Wooldoor does indeed have a dark side, he rarely shows it. He was called Wooldoor Jebediah Sockbat by Unusually Flexible Girl. Wooldoor is originally described as a "Whacky Whatchamacallit", but the species are named "sockbats". The rest of his species was exterminated in a holocaust by a species of Strawberry Shortcake-like characters.

In the movie, Wooldoor refers to himself as a "32-year-old schizophrenic drug addict with jaundice and several deformities."

It is shown in the episode "Drawn Together Babies", that he used to be a human named Walter Sagget, but Captain Hero personally caused his "deformities" on a Sit and Spin while interrogating him.

In original artwork for the show, Wooldoor's nose was yellow (like the rest of his skin), and he wore socks with sandals.

Foxxy Love 
Voiced by Cree Summer
A sharp-tongued African-American parody of Valerie Brown from Josie and the Pussycats, she is a promiscuous, mystery-solving musician. Most of her humor revolves around her sexual habits and her unsophisticated or uneducated manner of speech; she is often used to poke fun at black stereotypes, but is the wisest and most far-sighted of all the housemates. Her name is a portmanteau of the names of blaxploitation characters Foxy Brown and Christie Love. She has at least two children, Qualmella and Timmy (the circumstances of Timmy's missing status change from episode to episode), as well as a teenage grandson named Ray-Ray. All were mentioned in a few episodes and were then taken away from her. She was also a member of an all-female band, The Foxxy 5, which consisted of various other female versions of black cartoon characters and is a reference to The Jackson 5 and the "mystery solving" cliche in cartoons. Among reality show archetypes, she represents the sassy black woman, often acting as the voice of reason among the cast members (or as Wooldoor puts it, "the only one in the house who isn't completely retarded"), though she does have certain issues that spark her fiery temper, such as people taking her Funyuns. Foxxy also has father issues; he left for cigarettes when she was three years old. Her tail is the result of her father having sex with a fox.

In original artwork before the show's release, Foxxy Love wore a different outfit.

Toot Braunstein 
Voiced by Tara Strong
An overweight sex symbol from the 1920s who demands to be the center of attention, cuts herself with razor blades when depressed, and often instigates conflict in the house. She is based on Betty Boop. Most of her humor revolves around her unattractiveness (especially her weight), her gluttony, her poor personal hygiene, or her frequent bouts of psychosis and alcoholism. Among reality show archetypes, she is the manipulative, although later evolves into the dumpy fat/unpopular girl archetype. According to creators Jeser and Silverstein, Toot is partially based on Amy Crews from Big Brother 3. Toot's passion for cheese, as well as her tendency to cry and put on weight (from "Requiem for a Reality Show"), come directly from Crews. In an interview on Comedy Central's website, Strong states that Toot is her favorite role in her career.

In original artwork before the show's release, Toot had longer hair, a thin waist (with broad hips), and wore a strapless dress. In the third season, Toot becomes a much more sympathetic character, and her role as the show's mean-spirited character is largely taken over by Clara.

Ling-Ling 
Voiced by Abbey DiGregorio
A crazy and violent spoof of Pikachu from the Pokémon franchise with an exclamation mark for a tail who battles using various supernatural abilities and speaks in pseudo-Japanese gibberish (or "Japorean", as DiGregorio calls it; which is a portmanteau on Japanese and Korean) with English subtitles. Most of his humor revolves around his sociopathic desires or his difficulty assimilating into American culture; he is often used to poke fun at Asian stereotypes. Among reality show archetypes, he represents the culture-shocked foreigner. In "Freaks & Greeks", Ling-Ling's father states that Ling-Ling's full name is Ling-Ling Hitler Bin Laden Seacrest. However, according to executive producer Freiberger, this is just a gag and not canon. In "Super Nanny", it is shown that because Ling-Ling has slanted eyes he sees things as a manga instead of the way everyone else does. It was revealed that he had a bad relationship with his battle monster trainer, Gash (a parody of Ash Ketchum), who would not allow him a chance to live his dream of becoming a dancer; in retaliation, Ling-Ling shot an electric ball at Gash and proceeded to disembowel him. Ling-Ling's abilities include eye-beams, generating spheres of destructive energy with his hands, growing spines and claws when angered, detaching his tail and using it as a sword, secreting an addictive psychotropic drug from his skin when disappointed, and being able to sew almost anything out of raw materials (high-end sneakers, working televisions, etc.). One of the recurring gags about the "Japorean" language he speaks is the exclamation "Yoko Ono!" used in the place of "Oh No!". In the episode "Wooldoor Sockbat's Giggle-Wiggle Funny Tickle Non-Traditional Progressive Multicultural Roundtable!", Ling-Ling is identified as bisexual by a parody of The Terminator. In "Clum Babies", Ling-Ling struggles to pronounce the shampoo brand "Prell".

In original artwork before the show's release, Ling-Ling was green and much smaller, similar to Jerry the mouse from Tom and Jerry.

Xandir P. Whifflebottom 
Voiced by Jack Plotnick
A gay parody of video game and cartoon heroes, particularly Link from The Legend of Zelda and Cloud Strife from Final Fantasy VII. Xandir is extremely sensitive, and easily scared or worried; among reality show archetypes, he represents the token gay participant. At the start of the first season, he often claims to be on "a never-ending quest to save his girlfriend", but in the episode "Gay Bash", along with help from the other housemates, Xandir comes out of the closet and this is often poked fun at by the other males in the house, and criticized by the homophobic Princess Clara. Xandir's girlfriend dumped him, but he found new love with a genie reminiscent of the character Genie from Aladdin, who was promptly kidnapped by Xandir's nemesis Lord Slashstab. Xandir is now officially on a never-ending quest to save his boyfriend, but never really seems to do anything about it. It was revealed in "Wooldoor Sockbat's Giggle-Wiggle Funny Tickle Non-Traditional Progressive Multicultural Roundtable!" that he is from the "gay future" five years from the present, and was sent back in time to protect Wooldoor from the heterosexual Terminator. This contradicts the notion that he was a confused closet gay with a girlfriend when he entered the show, although the Terminator storyline was very likely only canon to that particular episode. He later became good friends with Wooldoor.

Along with Foxxy, Xandir is often the most sane or reasonable member of the house. He is frequently dismayed and surprised at the bizarre and illogical tangents the other housemates often take (especially Captain Hero, whom he shares an odd relationship based upon Captain Hero's particular mood). When asked for advice, his tends to be most grounded in the real-world, and he offers useful input. In one episode, Toot found a cheat code manual attached to a PlayStation 2 controller in the attic. When she used it she found that the cheats controlled Xandir. Being a video game character means that Xandir has "multiple lives" so even though he is sometimes killed on the show, he reappears without any damage with a counter flashing above his head indicating the number of lives he has left.

In original artwork before the show's release, Xandir's hair was dark brown and longer, and his skin tone was much darker. He was originally supposed to be a satyr, like the Greek god Pan. The lower half of his body was that of a goat, and he possessed horns as well.

Spanky Ham 
Voiced by Adam Carolla
According to the show's creators, Spanky Ham is a parody of crass Internet flash animation cartoons. Most of his humor revolves around his crudeness. Among reality show archetypes, he represents the boorish party animal. The creators also modeled Spanky's personality on David "Puck" Rainey from The Real World: San Francisco. During the first few episodes of the series, Spanky was the villain of the show, committing such horrible deeds as making a slave out of Ling-Ling in "Gay Bash", and forcing Wooldoor to trick Clara into singing in "Requiem for a Reality Show" so he could kill and eat all the woodland creatures that inexplicably appeared whenever she did so. However, toward the end of the first season, Ham bonded with Clara in "Dirty Pranking No. 2" and became more sympathetic; although Spanky kept bullying Wooldoor and making fun of Xandir, his behavior in this regard was more mischievous than malicious. Spanky has gone through character arcs with most of the main cast in order to show his more sympathetic side, such as helping Ling-Ling to drive, marrying Xandir for his insurance, and being Foxxy's representative in the Spelling Bee circuit.

Captain Hero 
Voiced by Jess Harnell
A dimwitted, lecherous, heteroflexible parody of Superman (and other superheroes), with a visual style taken from the cartoons of Bruce Timm and Max Fleischer. Most of his humor revolves around his perverse sexual tastes, his tendency toward violence, or his stupidity; there is also a running joke in which he is heavily suggested to be pansexual and interested in necrophilia. Among reality TV archetypes, he represents the macho egotist.

Of all the housemates, Captain Hero saw the most character development over the series. In the first season, Hero was a simple character with a fairly minor role on the show; he was introduced in the first episode as simply "another person in the house", and as Harnell puts it, his personality was that of an "overgrown frat guy" whose libido was his main source of humor. Over time, however, he grew considerably more complex; consequently, his role was expanded to the point where he became the most frequently used on the show. "The Other Cousin" was the first episode to focus on Hero, but it was the second-season episode "Little Orphan Hero" that proved to be a major turning point for the character. In the episode, Hero, after suffering a nervous breakdown, meets his parents for the first time and sees many long-dormant emotional issues rise to the surface. Subsequent episodes would expand on these developments. By the time of "A Very Special Drawn Together Afterschool Special", it seemed perfectly natural for Hero to be cast in the role of the sensitive and caring (if overly emotional) nurturer. Captain Hero has not been seen doing many activities commonly associated with superheroes. He has an "arch nemesis" called Scroto who is a parody of Lex Luthor, whose "villainous" activity always involves tricking Hero and only Hero into washing his testicles in which he says each time "Your balls are clean!" He is able to fly (although many jokes involve him not using that ability or it not working as expected) and punch through walls, laser vision (which he used in very few episodes), and once used his "Hero shield" (which involved using an innocent woman to shield himself from bullets). Despite his questionable abilities as a superhero, the world has seemingly been very dependent on Captain Hero to save the day, as it is a common sight to see news reports on disasters and the comment "Captain Hero, where are you?!" According to Harnell, Hero's most recognizable line is "save yourselves!" Whenever there is trouble, he takes off and leaves those who he had left behind to die.

In "Little Orphan Hero", it is revealed that Hero's real name is Leslie and in "Nipple Ring-Ring Goes to Foster Care" that he earned the name "Captain Hero" when he was 12 years old and masturbated with a hero sandwich in public. What would occur in a continuous spiral is Captain Hero telling his 12-year-old self (through a walkie-talkie via an electrical storm) to do stupid things. Captain Hero says that the one that did this to him told him to "go screw a garbage disposal", thus causing the "accident" that lost his penis – although he has been shown to possess one, and is particularly resilient to physical harm; he had a sexual relationship with Foxxy for an episode, in which they explored increasingly harmful parasexual activities, including disembowelment.

In original artwork before the show's release, Hero wore tights, and his suit was slightly darker in color and had a different symbol on it.

Recurring characters

Octopussoir 
First appearance: "Clara's Dirty Little Secret"
Voiced by Jess Harnell
When Clara was young, her evil stepmother put a curse on Clara's vagina, causing it to turn into a hideous, tentacled and French male monster known as the Octopussoir. Despite its frightening appearance (which makes nearly everyone vomit if they kiss it), the Octopussoir is actually quite kind, only attacking people when it is frightened by loud noises or provoked in some fashion. When the housemates first found out about it in "Clara's Dirty Little Secret", they wanted to kill it, but came to accept it once they realized how kind it was. Still, Clara never got over the stigma she felt not having a normal vagina, so she got rid of it through plastic surgery in "Alzheimer's That Ends Well". She eventually reconsidered, but when she tried to get the procedure reversed, Octopussoir told her that he had moved on, having completed college and married Unusually Flexible Girl (only referring to her as a 38-year-old Jewish woman) and was quite happy in his new life. Though saddened by this, Clara accepted that the Octopussoir had moved on and left. Octopussoir returns to its original, non-anthropomorphic form (it is not specified whether he was once again a part of Clara or was merely joining in the song) in "American Idol Parody Clip Show" during Clara and Foxxy's new-scaled rendition of "La La La La Labia". Its name is most likely a reference to Octopussy.

Bleh 
First appearance: "The Other Cousin"
Voiced by Sarah Silverman
Bleh is Clara's Intellectually disabled cousin. She has to wear a football helmet to protect her head, her eyes point in different directions, and she gapes vacantly. Her arms are held in a way which suggest cerebral palsy and she has to wear corrective shoes. In one scene, she is shown to have six toes on her right foot. However, she is impossibly attractive, to the point which Spanky calls her "retarded hot". Her speech consists almost solely of blurbs taken from critical reviews of the film I Am Sam. She makes a harsh braying sound when excited or distressed and is also prone to drooling. She sleeps in a pet carrier and had a short-lived relationship with Captain Hero, neither of them realizing that the other entered into the relationship to win a bet. She possesses the ability to count cards, as evidenced in "Ghostesses in the Slot Machine"; this ability was inspired by Dustin Hoffman's character in Rain Man. Bleh's name is a reference to The Facts of Life, a reference to how Blair Warner's handicapped cousin pronounced Blair's name. She can also catch thrown objects without looking, a reference to the films Awakenings and The Boy Who Could Fly.

Jun-Jee 
First appearance: "The Other Cousin"
Voiced by Jess Harnell
Jun-Jee is Ling-Ling's father who speaks in a stereotypical Japanese accent. Just as Ling-Ling is based on Pikachu, Jun-Jee seems to be based on Raichu, the older, evolved form of Pikachu. The creators revealed in the DVD commentary to "The Other Cousin" that his name is Jun-Jee, named after Jun Song and Jee Choe from Big Brother IV. It was not until "Freaks & Greeks" (season 3, episode 1), however, that the character's name was identified in the show. In that episode, Jun-Jee is heard saying "Jun-Jee" during his dialogue in "The Other Cousin", but as he is speaking Ling-Ling's language, it is not clear that whether he is referring to his name or not. "Freaks & Greeks" also reveals that Jun-Jee is extremely wealthy and that his vision is significantly impaired because of cataracts, which hampers his ability to enjoy one of his favorite hobbies, karaoke.

Relationship with Ling-Ling 
Ling-Ling's father made his debut in "The Other Cousin". In that episode, Ling-Ling was very disappointed after not receiving a visit from his father, whom he had not seen in a long time. However, Xandir, Toot, and Wooldoor felt sorry for the little guy and were able to find Ling-Ling's father for him. Father and son were promptly reunited, only to have Jun-Jee express bitter disappointment at seeing his son's being part of a reality show with "other losers". In "Clum Babies", he appeared in the form of an answering machine message, where he informed Ling-Ling of the arranged battle to N'Pul. In "The Other Cousin", he spoke in Ling-Ling's language, but in each of his subsequent appearances he speaks English. He used to be a great battle monster like Ling-Ling, but eventually retired and started a dry cleaning business, in which he coined the classic phrase "No Ticky, No Washy!". Like Ling-Ling, he secretes a hallucinogenic drug when disappointed.

In the past, Jun-Jee often missed out on important moments in his son's life. He also disapproves of Ling-Ling's lifestyle, feeling that Ling-Ling battles too much and needs to settle down and find one monster to battle with. Despite all this, he and his son share a clear bond with each other.

In "Clum Babies", Jun-Jee indicates he is still married to Ling-Ling's mother, but he is single by the time he makes his next appearance in "Freaks & Greeks". Whether he is widowed or divorced is not mentioned. In that episode, he falls in love with and marries Toot, though he grows to regret the union once he realizes that she only wants him for his money. The situation also causes a rift between him and Ling-Ling, though this rift is repaired by episode's end. At the end of the episode, after saying that outer space makes Asians gay ("that only explanation for George Takei"), he teleports out in a heart with Hikaru Sulu.

Appearance 
Physically, just like Ling-Ling looks like Pikachu and Jun-Jee looks like an ancient version of Raichu, the evolved form of Pikachu, indicating that Ling-Ling will one day evolve or grow up into a monster similar to Jun-Jee. He has circle marks on his back, and part of his ear has been bitten off, a possible reference to Splinter, the mentor of the Teenage Mutant Ninja Turtles. His fur is wrinkled and he has a Fu Manchu moustache. Unlike Ling-Ling, who appears to have three fingers, it appears that Jun-Jee has four fingers, though this may be associated with evolution. In "The Other Cousin", Ling-Ling mentioned attaining "Level Shmah". This may be the level at which he evolves to be more like Jun-Jee, but this is never clarified. Jun-Jee's tail is just like Ling-Ling's, but more like Pikachu. His rough appearance may be due to his many years of battling.

The King 
First appearance: "Dirty Pranking No. 2"
Voiced by Jonathan Kimmel
The King is Clara's father, and the source of all her bigoted beliefs. While Clara is a generic composite of nearly every Disney princess, the King seems to be based more specifically on Ariel's father, King Triton, from The Little Mermaid. He originally disliked Spanky Ham, but became friends with him after Spanky taught Clara how to laugh and have fun. He drives a carriage, sometimes while drunk (which, according to Clara's evil stepmother, is the reason Clara's mother is no longer around). His favorite activity is watching strippers, whose activities he always refers to as "the ballet"; in fact, his preoccupation with strippers made his relationship with Clara an emotionally distant one, since he always spent more time with strippers than he did with his daughter. In "Ghostesses in the Slot Machine", Clara takes up the profession to try to win his affection; though her efforts are initially unsuccessful, the King eventually tells Clara (and Foxxy) that he loves her after watching his daughter simulate lesbian sex with Foxxy on stage. He appears to have an incestuous interest in his daughter; in addition to being eager to see her strip (mentioned above), in "Dirty Pranking No. 2", he gives her a kiss that seems passionate rather than familial. He makes cameo appearances in "The Drawn Together Clip Show" and "Freaks & Greeks". His real name has not been revealed on the show. (Note: This character is not to be confused with the King of Insurance, a completely separate character from "Foxxy vs. the Board of Education".)

The Jew Producer 
First appearance: "The One Wherein There Is a Big Twist"
Voiced by James Arnold Taylor
Also known as "Mr. Jew Producer". He is sometimes the villain of the show. He looks like a man in a suit, except with a speaker where his head should be. This is a gag on the fact that, prior to his first physical appearance (in "The One Wherein There Is a Big Twist"), he was only heard as a voice on the intercom, the speaker of which looks like his head with a word said Metallica. He is in charge of the reality show and owns the house. He calls the housemates via intercom to inform them of reality show challenges and can be contacted when they need him. He openly admits that he sometimes edits the show in order to produce something more exciting, a practice to which both Foxxy and Toot strongly object.

In "The One Wherein There Is a Big Twist", after the housemates demand a material prize of some sort, he disguises himself as Bucky Bucks (a parody of Richie Rich and Donald Trump) to give them that challenge. After the contest is over, he reveals that it was all a hoax and then rips off his mask to reveal his true identity. In "The One Wherein There Is a Big Twist, Part II", he forces the housemates bow down to his penis in a humiliating game of Simon Says to allow them to return to the newly rebuilt house after they destroyed it. He hosted "The Drawn Together Clip Show", promising that at the end, one of the housemates would be crowned winner of Drawn Together. At the end, however, he announced that the viewer was the winner.

In the series finale, "American Idol Parody Clip Show", vocals from backstage indicate he kills two stagehands, then himself. In the same episode, he mentions that he was burned in a horrible accident, which explains why he has a speaker for his head. In The Drawn Together Movie: The Movie!, it is revealed that his stereotypically Jewish wife and young son both have speakers for heads.

He is the in-show representation of creators Dave Jeser and
Matt Silverstein, both of whom are also Jewish.

The Sockbats 
First appearance: "The One Wherein There Is a Big Twist, Part II"

The Sockbats are Wooldoor's people, who were largely wiped out in a holocaust by the Sweetcakes, who took to eating the Sockbats in the midst of a famine and ever since have been obsessed with cooking and eating Sockbats. Since that time, the ones who survived have become proficient in making pornography, creating the popular Sockbats Gone Wild video series. It is unknown how many Sockbats are still around, but all of Wooldoor's immediate family seem to be deceased. Often, as a joke, Sockbats will be inserted into the backgrounds of certain scenes (usually those taking place away from the house) as extras. Several were in attendance at "The Drawn Together Clip Show".

Strawberry Sweetcake 
First appearance: "The One Wherein There Is a Big Twist, Part II"
Voiced by Cree Summer
A parody of Strawberry Shortcake, Strawberry Sweetcake is a diminutive redheaded young woman (who appears to be eight years old, but is apparently eighteen). When Wooldoor hangs himself, the Jew Producer demands that the housemates find a replacement for him in order for them to be able to return to the house. After exhaustive interviews, they choose Strawberry Sweetcake. After Wooldoor returned to the house alive and well, he reveals that her people, the Sweetcakes, used to live peacefully with Wooldoor's people, the Sockbats. After a while, a great famine swept the lands. The Sweetcakes tagged the innocent Sockbats and fooled them into manual labor. Eventually, they turned the Sockbats into chocolate (a reference to the Holocaust, and a parody of the film Soylent Green). Sweetcake assures the housemates that it is all in the past, and they believe her, with the exception of Foxxy Love. Foxxy attempts to find out the truth about Sweetcake, but ends up being captured. Sweetcake then attempts to cook Wooldoor, but Foxxy manages to get free and expose her plan. After threatening the housemates with violence if they get in her way, Sweetcake is finally eaten by Toot, who has been blown back to the Drawn Together house. The character would later make appearances in "The Drawn Together Clip Show" and "Breakfast Food Killer".

Edward Goldberg 
First appearance: "Foxxy VS the Board of Education"
Voiced by Jess Harnell
Mr. Goldberg is a figure whom the show trots out any time a Jewish stereotype is needed (an example of the Jewish tradition of often scathingly self-deprecating humor – see Jewish humor). He has appeared in three episodes to date: he is the Orthodox Jew who "poisons" the well in "Foxxy vs. the Board of Education", the homeless person Wooldoor uses as a cadaver in "Terms of Endearment", and "the most confused villain in the world", Señor Eskimo Goldberg in "Captain Girl". All of Mr. Goldberg's appearances are of the random variety. No real continuity has been established for his character, as in the show's world he exists solely as a caricature rather than an actual living person.

Unusually Flexible Girl 
First Appearance: "Captain Hero's Marriage Pact"
Voiced by Tara Strong
Unusually Flexible Girl is a superheroine with the ability to stretch like elastic, a spoof of Elastigirl from Disney and Pixar's The Incredibles. She was Captain Hero's "girlfriend" ("they just boned a lot") in superhero school. Hero later on meets her again, and after a quick sex session, he learns she is interested in marriage. Uncomfortable with this, Hero convinces Wooldoor to marry her for him. But he later gets jealous of Wooldoor and wins her back, only to regret it. Wooldoor starts to feel the same. Around the end of the episode, she gets shot in the head by Clara and Toot with a potato cannon. She was pronounced dead but was revealed to be alive in "Alzheimer's That Ends Well". She is seen marrying Octopussoir and was referred to as a 38-year-old Jewish woman who would marry just about anyone.

Steve from Long Island 
First appearance: "Clum Babies"
Voiced by James Arnold Taylor
In his first appearance in "Clum Babies", Steve is referred to as "Ling-Ling's lame friend Steve"; however, when he reappeared in "Mexican't Buy Me Love", he is considered one of the Cool Kids despite the fact his personality is essentially the same. However, this may be because it was Captain Hero who originally referred to him as lame, and Hero would later be judged not to be cool himself. He was killed along with the rest of the characters during Bob the Cucumber's brutal rampage, he was presumably resurrected by Wooldoor after he is finished masturbating. Little has been revealed of Steve's background other than the fact that he is a regular club-goer who has a past friendship with Ling-Ling. In his second appearance, however, he does not interact with Ling-Ling at any point, and their friendship is not mentioned. It is also "revealed" that Steve has a third arm, but this is obviously just a gag.

Steve also makes a cameo appearance as an audience member in "The Drawn Together Clip Show". In "Charlotte's Web of Lies", an actor is dressed like Steve and has a musical number in "Drawn Together: The Musical". He is always seen wearing a green shirt with diagonal stripes, white pants, and sunglasses. Steve's personality is very laid-back, and he is often seen with one or two female companions in tow. His surname is never revealed.

Judge Fudge 
First appearance: "The Lemon-AIDS Walk"
Voiced by James Arnold Taylor
Judge Fudge, as his name would imply, is a square of fudge who fights crime and serves as a judge. He has his own TV series, The Judge Fudge Adventure Power Hour, a parody of '70s blaxploitation films and courtroom TV shows. He also has his own theme song, "The Judge Fudge Theme", a funk/soul song which plays whenever he makes an appearance. Unfortunately, he never seems to have time to do anything because, as he always explains in his catchphrase, "I'm far too busy being delicious." He is revealed in "The Lemon-AIDS Walk" to be a steroid user and, in "The Drawn Together Clip Show", the Jew Producer reveals that he was last year's Drawn Together winner (although he admits he hasn't had time to enjoy his victory as he's been far too busy being delicious). Usually, Judge Fudge's appearances are quick cameos designed strictly to be gags. But in "N.R.A.y RAY", he finally plays an active role in a story when he is the judge who presides over Foxxy's trial. He doesn't render a verdict, however, for the usual reason. For the premiere of the second half of Season Three, a six-episode internet cartoon series of Judge Fudge was simultaneously viewable on Comedy Central's website.

Child Services 
First Appearance: "Captain Girl"
Voiced by Paget Brewster ("Captain Girl"), Tara Strong ("Nipple Ring-Ring Goes to Foster Care")
Child Services is a woman who works for the Child Services company. She is a serious woman who always has a dull and stern look on her face. She will visit the Drawn Together House whenever she hears word that there is a baby or young child being abused or living in improper conditions, so that she can take them to foster families. She is, however, very illogical, as she will take children from their unfit homes and relocate them in even more unfit foster homes. She most often visits Foxxy Love and she will take away her children whenever she has one. She resembles Faragonda from Winx Club.

Gash 
First appearance: "Charlotte's Web of Lies"
Voiced by Jason Huber
Gash is a black-haired adolescent boy who is the former trainer/best friend of Ling-Ling. A spoof of Pokémon's Ash Ketchum (the trainer of Pikachu, whom Ling-Ling is based on), Gash captures and trains battle monsters to fight using a red and white pyramid, a reference to Poké Balls. Several years ago, Gash ruined Ling-Ling's dreams of becoming a dancer by capturing him and taking his dancing shoes away, forcing him into a life of fighting.

A clip of Ling-Ling attacking Gash and disemboweling him is shown in previous episodes.

Excludie 
First appearance: "Lost in Parking Space – Part 1"

Excludie is a diminutive furry yellow humanoid who is very excitable and outgoing, but, as his name suggests, is always being ostracized from the other housemates' activities.

Ni-Pul 
First appearance: "Clum Babies"
Voiced by Cree Summer
Ni-Pul is a purple female cat-like battle monster with whom Ling-Ling's father paired Ling-Ling in an arranged relationship. Her name is a pun on the word "nipple".

After Ling-Ling's father informed him that he was to be set up with an "arranged battle", Ling-Ling was distinctly opposed to the idea. However, he changed his mind once he actually saw Ni-Pul, falling in love with her at first sight. The two were in love and battled often, but eventually the constant battling lost its novelty, and Ni-Pul became visibly less interested in battling Ling-Ling. When Ling-Ling confronted her about how the passion had gone from their relationship, Ni-Pul suggested that they reinvigorate the relationship by dropping the battle metaphor and simply having sex. Ling-Ling agreed to it, and they happily spent the rest of the episode fooling around until Bob the Cucumber killed them both during his mad shooting spree. Though she was apparently revived by Wooldoor's Clum Babies, her relationship with Ling-Ling is never mentioned again.

Bob the Cucumber 
First Appearance: "Clum Babies"
Voiced by James Arnold Taylor
Bob the Cucumber is an anthropomorphic cucumber, a Catholic extremist, and the main antagonist in "Clum Babies". He goes on a murderous rampage, killing everyone except Wooldoor which made him shot himself. He is a parody of Larry the Cucumber from VeggieTales.

Larry the Tomato 
First Appearance: "Clum Babies"
Voiced by James Arnold Taylor
Larry the Tomato is an anthropomorphic tomato and a Catholic extremist. He got brutally murdered at the ending by Bob, along with Princess Clara, Foxxy, Spanky Ham, Ling-Ling, Ni-Pul, Captain Hero, Xandlir, and more other people. He is a parody of Bob the Tomato from VeggieTales. He is later seen in "The Drawn Together Clip Show" as an audience member.

Charlotte 
First Appearance: "Drawn Together Babies"
Voiced by Kath Soucie
Charlotte is a teenage girl assigned to babysit the Drawn Together babies, but is nothing but cruel to them. After the babies' parents leave, she cusses them out and leaves to meet her boyfriend Chad Huffington. However, the babies plot revenge and inadvertently kill her in the process, breaking her neck over a rocking horse. She is later revealed to be alive until Toot beat her over the head with a pool cleaning device and she drowned.

Franken Berry 
First Appearance: "Breakfast Food Killer"
Voiced by Jason Huber
The mascot for the cereal Franken Berry and the main antagonist of the episode "Breakfast Food Killer". His mission was to collect all of the UPC codes in order to take down the cereal empire and make it his own. He did this by gaining the trust of Wooldoor and harnessing his power for evil.

The Network Head 
First appearance: "The Drawn Together Movie: The Movie!"
Voiced by Vernon Wells
The Network Head, named Scott, is the primary antagonist in the film. As his name suggests, he is the head of the television network airing the show. He lost his wife and his daughter, Sasha, who was killed in the car crash after her daughter saw a billboard depicting Foxxy and Clara making simulated love, and fell into a vat of acid. This made the Network Head try to cancel the show to exact his revenge for his family. He designed a robot named I.S.R.A.E.L. (Intelligent Smart Robot Animation Eraser Lady) to have the housemates erased from existence. The Network Head was defeated and killed after being impaled on a spike, but despite this, his plan to cancel the show has succeeded as the cast ended up being erased afterwards.

The Suck My Taint Girl 
First appearance: "The Drawn Together Movie: The Movie!"
Voiced by Cree Summer
The Suck My Taint Girl is a girl, presumably around 7 or 8 years old, who has her own show The Suck My Taint Show that replaced the reality show in which the protagonists starred. She is drawn in a style similar to that of South Park, which had taken over Drawn Togethers timeslot when the show was canceled in real life.

When Foxxy, Spanky, and Wooldoor arrive to ask for help, the Suck My Taint Girl reveals herself to be a fan of the fictional, in-universe Drawn Together TV series, and informs them that the way to get back on the air is the get a point in Make-A-Point Land. She informs Foxxy that if she can assemble the rest of the group, she will lead them to Make-A-Point-Land. Foxxy agrees and manages to round up everyone except Clara, who has been killed. The Suck My Taint Girl is saddened by Clara's death, but agrees to take the group to meet the Make-A-Point wizard.

It is later revealed that the Suck My Taint Girl was the one who tricked them, and in fact, hates Drawn Together, as well as being in a relationship with the Network Head. She declares that she has no intention of letting the housemates get their timeslot back. She is eventually erased when they drop the detonator for the eraser bomb under the Network Head's coat is dropped and set off, erasing the entirety of Make-A-Point-Land, along with the Jew Producer and the Wizard. The housemates make it out just in time.

Molly 
First appearance: "The Drawn Together Movie: The Movie!"

Molly is a dead, young woman who appears as Captain Hero's "love interest" in The Drawn Together Movie: The Movie! It is unknown if Molly is in fact the woman's real name, or if Captain Hero made it up for her. Hero believes that Molly is in fact alive and returns his affections, but the rest of the cast (especially Xandir) know she is in fact dead and just another victim of Hero's strange sexual behaviors.

References 

Lists of characters in American television adult animation
Lists of American sitcom television characters
Television characters introduced in 2004
Drawn Together